Pornic is a railway station in Pornic, Pays de la Loire, France. The station is located on the Sainte-Pazanne–Pornic railway. The station is served by TER (local) services operated by the SNCF:
local services (TER Pays de la Loire) Nantes - Sainte-Pazanne - Pornic

References

Railway stations in Loire-Atlantique
Railway stations in France opened in 1875